Eric Robert Turner (1909-date of death unknown) was an English athlete.

Athletics
He competed in the javelin at the 1930 British Empire Games for England.

Personal life
He was a guardsman at the time of the 1930 Games and lived in Luton.

References

1909 births
Year of death missing
English male javelin throwers
Athletes (track and field) at the 1930 British Empire Games
Commonwealth Games competitors for England